Gavarnie is a former commune in the Hautes-Pyrénées department, Southwestern France. On 1 January 2016, it was merged into the new commune of Gavarnie-Gèdre. Gavarnie is known for the Cirque de Gavarnie, and the Gavarnie Falls in it, part of the UNESCO World Heritage Site Pyrénées – Mont Perdu.

The Prime Meridian passes through Gavarnie, including at its southernmost point in France – the commune touches Aragon, Spain.

See also
Communes of the Hautes-Pyrénées department

References

Former communes of Hautes-Pyrénées
Pyrenees
World Heritage Sites in France